This is a list of settlements in South Yorkshire by population based on the results of the 2011 census. The next United Kingdom census will take place in 2021. In 2011, there were 34 built-up area subdivisions with 5,000 or more inhabitants in South Yorkshire, shown in the table below.

Administrative boundaries

Table taken from the South Yorkshire - Geography subsection:

Population ranking

See also 
 South Yorkshire (County)
 Sheffield urban area

Notes

References 

Metropolitan areas of England
 
South Yorkshire
South Yorkshire